The GRE subject test in mathematics is a standardized test in the United States created by the Educational Testing Service (ETS), and is designed to assess a candidate's potential for graduate or post-graduate study in the field of mathematics. It contains questions from many fields of mathematics; about 50% of the questions come from calculus (including pre-calculus topics, multivariate calculus, and differential equations), 25% come from algebra (including linear algebra, abstract algebra, and number theory), and 25% come from a broad variety of other topics typically encountered in undergraduate mathematics courses, such as point-set topology, probability and statistics, geometry, and real analysis.

Similar to all the GRE subject tests, the GRE Mathematics test is paper-based, as opposed to the GRE general test which is usually computer-based. It contains approximately 66 multiple-choice questions, which are to be answered within 2 hours and 50 minutes. Scores on this exam are required for entrance to most math Ph.D. programs in the United States.

Scores are scaled and then reported as a number between 200 and 990; however, in recent versions of the test, the maximum and minimum reported scores have been 920 and 400, which correspond to the 99th percentile and the 1st percentile, respectively. The mean score for all test takers from July 1, 2011 to June 30, 2014 was 659, with a standard deviation of 137.

Prior to October 2001, a significant percentage of students were achieving perfect scores on the exam, which made it difficult for competitive programs to differentiate between students in the upper percentiles. As a result, the test was reworked and renamed "The Mathematics Subject Test (Rescaled)". According to ETS, "Scores earned on the test after October 2001 should not be compared to scores earned prior to that date."

Tests generally take place three times per year, on one Saturday in each of September, October, and April. Students must register for the exam approximately five weeks before the administration of the exam.

See also

 Graduate Record Examination
 GRE Biochemistry Test
 GRE Biology Test
 GRE Chemistry Test
 GRE Literature in English Test
 GRE Physics Test
 GRE Psychology Test
 Graduate Management Admission Test (GMAT)
 Graduate Aptitude Test in Engineering (GATE)

References 

Mathematics tests
Year of introduction missing